Karunas (born 21 February 1970 as Karunanidhi Sethu) is an Indian actor, politician and  comedian in the Tamil film industry. Appearing mostly in supporting roles, he has also played lead roles in films including Dindigul Sarathy (2008) and Ambasamudram Ambani (2008). Apart from acting, Karunas has also been credited in films as a producer, music composer and a singer, while he continues to serve as the Vice-President of the Nadigar Sangam, after being elected in October 2015.

Early life 
Karunas was born in Kuruvikkarambai, a village  in Thanjavur, Tamil Nadu, India. He did his schooling at Palangudi Bharathi School and later studied at Nandanam Arts, Presidency College. Karunas began his career as pop singer and dancer, working extensively on Tamil folk music. He then gradually appeared in films as a comedian.

Film career 
Karunas began work as a gaana singer aged 12, earning the moniker "Gaana" Karunas, and made his television debut through Yuhi Sethu's Naiyaandi Darbar show in the late 1990s as a musician. Director Bala heard one of his songs and subsequently signed Karunas on for an acting role in his second directorial venture, the drama film Nandha (2001). He was cast as the comedian and his role as 'Lodukku' it was successful , prompting him to accept further film offers. He subsequently went on to appear in notable films including Baba (2002), Pithamagan (2003), Vasool Raja MBBS (2004) and Polladhavan (2007) in supporting comedy roles. Karunas has also distributed two films, Pori (2007) and Kattradhu Thamizh (2007), but the failure of both films has prompted him to stay away from distributing any further ventures.

Karunas first appeared in the lead role in the comedy drama, Dindigul Sarathy (2008), portraying an insecure man with an inferiority complex. With heavy promotions by Sun Pictures, the film became a surprise success at the box office and prompted Karunas to appear in further lead roles in the comedy films Ambasamudram Ambani (2010), Chandhamama (2013), Ragalaipuram (2013) and Lodukku Pandi (2015). In between the films, he also essayed serious performances, and was briefly involved in the making of Thanga Meengal (2013) before it underwent a change of cast, while he was successful for his role in Santosh Sivan's war drama film, Ceylon (2014). His films as the lead hero, gradually had lower key promotions than the previous ones, and in 2015, Karunas announced he would not appear in any further lead roles. He subsequently made a return to starring supporting roles thereafter, being successful for his performance of a suicidal man in Darling (2015) and as a villager in Komban (2015), which became his hundredth film. In Azhagu Kutti Chellam (2016), Karunas has given one of his career best performances  . He subsequently changed his mind about not appearing in leading roles, and began work on the sequel to Dindigul Sarathy in September 2016. In 2016, he has also continued to act in comedy films including Jithan 2, Enakku Innoru Per Irukku, Dhilluku Dhuddu and  Ka Ka Ka Po. Karunas plays the responsible uncle, more than a comedian in Soorarai Pottru (2020) which has been a commercial success.

Political career 
He was the leader of Mukkulathor Pulipadai, a Thevar political outfit. He contested for the Tamil Nadu State Legislative Assembly from Thiruvadanai in the Tamil Nadu Legislative Assembly election 2016 with AIADMK's Two Leaves (Irratai Ilai) as his election symbol. He won it with a margin of over 10,000 votes.

On 25 February 2017, an unidentified person threw footwear at Karunas' car while out to garland a statue of freedom fighter U. Muthuramalingam Thevar. It is believed that the incident could be connected to his support of AIADMK leader V. K. Sasikala.

Personal life 
Karunas is married to Grace, a playback singer in the Tamil film industry. The pair had met when Karunas was the guest judge at an inter-collegiate singing competition, and after being impressed, Karunas asked her to sing in his personal music album. The couple have a daughter and a son named Ken Karunas who is a child artist in the movie industry, who was born in 2001, making his debut in Nedunchaalai.

Karunas's younger brother, Nagas, was set to making his acting debut through C. Ranganathan's Vantharu Jaicharu, but the film eventually did not release.

Partial filmography

As an actor

As a music director

As a singer

References

External links 
 

Indian male film actors
Tamil male actors
Indian male comedians
Tamil comedians
Tamil film score composers
Living people
1970 births
People from Thanjavur district
Male actors from Tamil Nadu
Tamil Nadu politicians
Indian actor-politicians
Tamil Nadu MLAs 2016–2021